Owen Moffat (born 6 January 2002) is a Scottish professional footballer who plays as a winger for Blackpool.

Professional career
A youth product of Celtic since the age of 7, Moffat signed a professional contract with the club in 2019, and extended it on 6 January 2021. He made his professional debut with Celtic in a 2–1 Scottish Premiership win over Ross County on 15 December 2021. Four days later, on 19 December, he came in as a substitute in the Scottish League Cup Final, thus being involved in Celtic's final victory against Hibernian. Finally, on 22 December, he made his first league start against St Mirren. Throughout the 2021-22 season, the winger was also heavily involved with Celtic's B Team in the Lowland League, where he collected fourteen goals and eight assists in 31 games.

On 30 August 2022, Moffat joined English side Blackpool, initially as part of the club's development squad. He signed a three-year deal with the club, with an option for a further year.

Honours
Celtic

Scottish Premiership: 2021–22
Scottish League Cup: 2021–22

References

External links
 

2002 births
Living people
People from Denny, Falkirk
Scottish footballers
Celtic F.C. players
Blackpool F.C. players
Scottish Professional Football League players
Association football wingers
Lowland Football League players
Footballers from Falkirk (council area)